Mo's spiny rat (Maxomys moi) is a species of rodent in the family Muridae.
It is found in Laos and Vietnam.

References

Maxomys
Mammals described in 1922
Taxonomy articles created by Polbot
Rodents of Vietnam
Rodents of Laos